Ikechukwu Eric Ahiauzu better known as Ric Hassani (born  on 6 January 1989, in Port Harcourt) is a Nigerian singer, songwriter and musician.

Education 
Hassani graduated from Covenant University in Nigeria. He attended the University of Surrey, where he earned a master's degree in energy economics.

Musical career
Hassani released his debut album The African Gentleman in 2016. He is said to have a dress style that is influenced by his self-acclaimed stance as a gentleman.

Awards and nominations 
Hassani was nominated in three categories at the 2016 All Africa Music Awards: Best Artiste in African R&B and Soul, Video of the Year, and Most Promising Artiste. He also received two nominations at The Headies 2016, including Best Alternative Song for "Gentleman".

In December 2018, the Falz and Olamide-assisted "Believe" won Best Collaboration at the Galaxy Music Awards.

Discography

Studio albums
The African Gentleman (2016)
The Prince I Became (2021)

References 

1989 births
Living people
Singers from Port Harcourt
Songwriters from Rivers State
Covenant University alumni
21st-century Nigerian singers